This is a list of articles for JBoss software, and projects from the JBoss Community and Red Hat. This open-source software written in Java is developed in projects, and productized with commercial-level support by Red Hat.

JBoss productized software

JBoss projects and software

See also 
 Comparison of application servers
 Comparison of business integration software
 Comparison of integrated development environments
 Comparison of network monitoring systems
 Comparison of object-relational mapping software
 Comparison of web server software

References 

JBoss software